Patrick Dwyer (19 December 1965) is an Irish hurling manager and former player. At club level he played with Carrickshock and was also a member of the Kilkenny senior hurling team. He usually lined out as a full-back.

Career

Dwyer first came to prominence at juvenile and underage levels with the Carrickshock club before eventually joining the club's top adult team. He first appeared on the inter-county scene with the Kilkenny junior team that won the All-Ireland Junior Championship title in 1988. This success saw Dwyer drafted on to the Kilkenny senior hurling team in 1989. He was full-back on the Kilkenny team that won consecutive All-Ireland CHampionship titles in 1992 and 1993. Dwyer's other honours include two National League titles, three consecutive Leinster Championship medals and an All-Star Award. In retirement from playing he became involved in team management with Carrickshock.

Honours

Team

Kilkenny
All-Ireland Senior Hurling Championship: 1992, 1993
Leinster Senior Hurling Championship: 1991, 1992, 1993
National Hurling League: 1989-90, 1994-95
All-Ireland Junior Hurling Championship: 1988
Leinster Junior Hurling Championship: 1988

Individual

Awards
All-Star Award: 1997

References 

1965 births
Living people
Carrickshock hurlers
Kilkenny inter-county hurlers
Hurling managers
All-Ireland Senior Hurling Championship winners